The Burkhart-Dibrell House, also known as Monrean House, is a historic house at 500 Main Street in Ketchikan, Alaska. This three story wood-frame house was built in 1904 by H. Z. Burkart, the founder of Ketchikan Spruce Mills, and is the only significant surviving Queen Anne style house in Ketchikan. It occupies a prominent position at the head of Main Street, and has long been a local landmark. In 1916, the house was purchased by Captain Walter Dibrell, Superintendent of Lighthouses for all of Alaska. The house's most prominent feature is its turret with conical roof and gold spire.

The house was listed on the National Register of Historic Places in 1982.

See also
National Register of Historic Places listings in Ketchikan Gateway Borough, Alaska

References

1904 establishments in Alaska
Houses in Ketchikan Gateway Borough, Alaska
Houses on the National Register of Historic Places in Alaska
Ketchikan, Alaska
Buildings and structures on the National Register of Historic Places in Ketchikan Gateway Borough, Alaska
Queen Anne architecture in Alaska
Houses completed in 1904